Allenport is the name of some places in the U.S. state of Pennsylvania:

Allenport, Huntingdon County, Pennsylvania
Allenport, Washington County, Pennsylvania